Sabri Gharbi (born May 26, 1987, in Relizane) is an Algerian football player. He currently plays for RC Relizane in the Algerian Ligue Professionnelle 1.

Honours
ASO Chlef
Algerian Ligue 1: 2010–11

MC Alger
Algerian Cup: 2013–14
Algerian Super Cup: 2014

References

External links
 
 

1987 births
Living people
Algerian footballers
Algerian Ligue Professionnelle 1 players
People from Relizane
ASO Chlef players
MC Alger players
Olympique de Médéa players
CS Constantine players
MC Oran players
RC Relizane players
Association football defenders
21st-century Algerian people